The Liszt Ferenc Academy of Music (often abbreviated as Zeneakadémia, "Liszt Academy") is a music university and a concert hall in Budapest, Hungary, founded on November 14, 1875. It is home to the Liszt Collection, which features several valuable books and manuscripts donated by Franz Liszt upon his death, and the AVISO studio, a collaboration between the governments of Hungary and Japan to provide sound recording equipment and training for students. The Liszt Ferenc Academy of Music was founded by Franz Liszt himself (though named after its founder only in 1925, approx. 50 years after it was relocated to its current location at the heart of Budapest).

Facilities

The Academy was originally called the "Royal National Hungarian Academy of Music" and it was also called "College of Music" from 1919 to 1925. It was then named after its founder Franz Liszt in 1925. It was founded in Liszt's home, and relocated to a three-story Neo-Renaissance building designed by Adolf Láng and built on today's Andrássy Avenue between 1877 and 1879. That location is referred to as "Old Academy of Music" and commemorated by a 1934 plaque made by Zoltán Farkas. It was repurchased by the academy in the 1980s, and is now officially known as "Ferenc Liszt Memorial and Research Center." 

Replacing the "Old Academy of Music", the Academy moved into a building erected in 1907 at the corner of Király Street and Liszt Ferenc square. It serves as a centre for higher education, music training, and concert hall. The Art Nouveau style building is one of the most well known in Budapest. It was designed by Flóris Korb and Kálmán Giergl at the request of Baron Gyula Wlassics, who was the Minister of Culture at that time. The façade is dominated by a statue of Liszt (sculpted by Alajos Stróbl). The inside of the building is decorated with frescoes, Zsolnay ceramics, and several statues (among them that of Béla Bartók and Frédéric Chopin). Originally the building also had stained glass windows, made by Miksa Róth.

Other facilities used by the Academy are the Budapest Teacher Training College, located in the former National Music School on Semmelweis Street, a secondary school (Bartók Béla Secondary School of Music, Instrument Making and Repair), and a student dormitory.

Ever since its foundation, the Academy has been the most prestigious music university operating in Hungary. A major development in its history was the recent establishment of a new, independent Folk Music Faculty. The Franz Liszt Academy of Music is as much a living monument to Hungary's continued musical life, as it is to the country's musical past. Its president (rector) is Andrea Vigh.

Other names
 Liszt Ferenc Zeneművészeti Egyetem (2007–) 
 Liszt Ferenc Zeneművészeti Főiskola egyetemi ranggal (2000–2007) 
 Liszt Ferenc Zeneművészeti Főiskola (1925–2000) 
 Országos Magyar Zeneművészeti Főiskola (1918–1925) 
 Országos Magyar Királyi Zeneakadémia (1893–1918)
 Országos Magyar Királyi Zene- és Színművészeti Akadémia (1887–1893) 
 Országos Magyar Királyi Zeneakadémia (1875–1887)

Notable alumni

Edith Lorand
Márta Ábrahám
Anneli Aarika-Szrok
Jenö Ádám
 Eak-tai Ahn
Géza Anda
Gábor Bánát
György Bánhalmi
Béla Bartók
Munir Bashir
Omar Bashir
Sari Biró
Gergely Bogányi
Margit Bokor
Nicolae Bretan
Charles Brunner
Georges Cziffra
Krisztián Cser
Gábor Darvas
José De Eusebio
Ernő Dohnányi
Antal Doráti
Iván Erőd
Peter Erős
Ferenc Farkas
Edith Farnadi
András Fejér
George Feyer
Annie Fischer
Andor Földes
Peter Frankl
János Fürst
Zoltán Gárdonyi
Sylvia Geszty
János Gonda
Dénes Gulyás
László Gyimesi
Julia Hamari
Kato Havas
Erzsébet Házy
Endre Hegedűs
Frigyes Hidas
Marta Hidy
Jenő Hubay
Jenő Huszka
Sándor Jemnitz
Zoltán Jeney
Ilona Kabos
Pál Kadosa
Emmerich Kálmán
László Kalmár
Balint Karosi
Bela Katona
István Kertész
Edward Kilenyi
Elisabeth Klein
Zoltán Kocsis
Zoltán Kodály
Rezső Kókai
Péter Komlós
Tibor Kozma
Lili Kraus
Adrienne Krausz
György Kurtág
István Kuthy
Magda László
Sylvia Leidemann
Vlastimil Lejsek
András Ligeti
György Ligeti
Pál Lukács
Éva Marton
Gwendolyn Masin
 Tibor Ney
Gábor Ormai
Eugene Ormandy
Attila Pacsay
Ditta Pásztory-Bartók
Zoltán Peskó
László Polgár
David Popper
Ferenc Rados
Thomas Rajna
Fritz Reiner
József Réti
Lívia Rév
Anthony Ritchie
Andrea Rost
Ákos Rózmann
Vera Rozsa
Zoltán Rozsnyai
György Sándor
Szabolcs Sándor
Sylvia Sass
András Schiff
Károly Schranz
György Sebők
Jenő Sevely
Rane Shephard
Béla Síki
Georg Solti
László Somogyi
János Starker
Rezső Sugár
Enid Szánthó
Zoltán Székely
Eugen Szenkar
Alex Szilasi
András Szőllősy
Charity Sunshine Tillemann-Dick
Zeynep Üçbaşaran
Gregory Vajda
Tibor Varga
Margit Varró
Tamás Vásáry
Balint Vazsonyi
Gabriel von Wayditch
László Weiner
Leo Weiner
Wanda Wiłkomirska

Notable faculty (past and present)

Emil Ábrányi
Dezső Antalffy-Zsiross
Lajos Bárdos
Béla Bartók
Ernő Dohnányi
Iván Erőd
Ferenc Farkas
Edith Farnadi
Zoltán Gárdonyi
Lájos Hernadi
Jenő Hubay
Jenő Jandó
Pál Kadosa
Zoltán Kodály
Hans von Koessler
Rezső Kókai
Dénes Kovács
Erzsébet Kozma
György Kurtág
Márta Kurtág
Franz Liszt
Pál Lukács
Éva Marton
David Popper
Ferenc Rados
József Réti
Albert Simon
Péter Solymos
László Somogyi
Arnold Székely
Árpád Szendy
Gusztáv Szerémi
István Thomán
Sándor Végh
Sándor Veress
János Viski
Leo Weiner
Ede Zathureczky

See also
 List of concert halls
 Music of Budapest

References

External links
 Official site
 Liszt Academy of Music at Google Cultural Institute

 
Buildings and structures in Budapest
Culture in Budapest
Music schools in Hungary
1875 establishments in Hungary
Art Nouveau architecture in Budapest
Concert halls in Hungary
Art Nouveau educational buildings
Art Nouveau theatres